Koznitsa is a village in south-eastern Bulgaria, situated in the Nesebar Municipality of the Burgas Province.

Villages in Burgas Province